Evert Endt is a French designer.

Early life
Evert Endt was born in Zaandam, the Netherlands, in 1933. He grew up in Switzerland and studied in Zurich at the Kunstgewerbeschule.

Career
In 1958, Endt started his career in the Compagnie de L'Esthétique Industrielle (CEI) by Raymond Loewy, a design agency based in Paris. He later became the Artistic Director and in 1968 the Director of the CEI, which is responsible for numerous programs of global design such as BP (British Petroleum), Royal Dutch Shell, Coop, and Elna Lotus (Permanent Collection of the Museum of Modern Art New York) and Rivella, Motta.

In 1974, he received French nationality. The following year, he set up Endt+Fulton Partners with American designer James F. Fulton. Since 1992 the agency participated in social programs focused on the environment. He works for various cultural and industrial bodies, under the Ministries of Health, Culture and French Justice.

He created exhibitions for the Centre Georges Pompidou and the Cité des Sciences et de l'Industrie de la Villette. His permanent and temporary thematic exhibitions include "Living in Space", "Energies", and "New Materials".

In 1992, Evert Endt was appointed as director of Ensci/Les Ateliers - Ecole Nationale Supérieure de Creation Industrielle - in Paris. The following year, he became director for the postgraduate program in research and management of new technologies in the Samsung Laboratory for Innovative Design.

Awards
 Prix International "Intérieur 80" Biennale de Courtrai 1980
 Label design français (esthétique industrielle) 1982-84
 Janus de l'Industrie 1985
 Oscar du journal Nouvel Économiste 1986
 Nomination of Chevalier des arts et lettres par le Ministère de la Culture 1998

Publications
 France culture
 The New York Times 
 Graphis
 Musée d'art moderne et contemporain Saint-Etienne Métropole
 The Washington Post
 ARTE
 ARTE 2017

References

External links 

1933 births
Living people
French designers
Dutch emigrants to France
People from Zaanstad